Shathah Subdistrict  is a Syrian nahiyah (subdistrict) located in Al-Suqaylabiyah District in Hama.  According to the Syria Central Bureau of Statistics (CBS), Shathah Subdistrict had a population of 25,273 in the 2004 census.

References 

Shathah
Al-Suqaylabiyah District